Paweł Moskwik (born 8 June 1992) is a Polish professional footballer who plays as a midfielder for II liga club Znicz Pruszków.

References

External links
 
 

1992 births
Living people
Association football midfielders
Polish footballers
Ekstraklasa players
I liga players
II liga players
Piast Gliwice players
Puszcza Niepołomice players
Podbeskidzie Bielsko-Biała players
Znicz Pruszków players
Motor Lublin players
People from Oświęcim
Sportspeople from Lesser Poland Voivodeship